The Monarchy of Nnewi concerns the monarchical head of state of Nnewi, which is a traditional and hereditary monarchy with a tetrarchy system. The Kingdom of Nnewi has been a monarchy since 15th century. Chiefdoms were set up at various dates in the four quarters, but it was naturally in Otolo - the original settlement of Mmaku, the grandfather of Nnewi - that the first chiefdom was established under the reign of Mmaku in 1498. Mmaku's wife was Ifenweugwu and his son, Ikenga. Mmaku was on his death succeeded by Ikenga, who married Ifite and begot a child he named Nnewi. Later, Isu, Ifite and Ichi were begotten.

Until now, the ruling house of Otolo which is as well that of the entire Nnewi is in Nnofo family in Otolo, Nnewi. In the other three quarters of Nnewi, his influence is also felt although there are Obi in Uruagu, Umudim and Nnewichi quarters.

The role of the Monarch is limited to the four quarters of Nnewi, and have no part in the formal governance of the Anambra State. The Monarch and the members of the Royal Family undertake a variety of official, unofficial and other representational duties within Nnewi, Nigeria  and abroad.

Since 1477 till date, the List of Igbo monarchs gives a list of Igbo
chieftains and kings from their earliest known history up to the current monarch.

Chief Kenneth Onyeneke, Igwe Orizu III became King on 2 June 1963 on the death of his father, Chief Josiah Nnaji, Igwe Orizu II.

List of Nnewi Monarchs

References

Nnewi
Nnewi monarchs
Igbo monarchs
Nigerian traditional rulers
Nnewi
Populated places in Anambra State